is a city located in Okayama Prefecture, Japan. The city was founded on March 30, 1953. , the city has an estimated population of 41,460 and a population density of 170 people per km2.

Mergers
On March 1, 2005, the town of Yoshii (from Shitsuki District), and the town of Bisei (from Oda District) were merged into Ibara.

Education
Although the population of Ibara is small, it boasts 6 JET Programme ALTs. The ALTs team teach with Japanese English teachers at the primary, middle school, and secondary levels.

Attractions
In Bisei one can visit the famous astronomical observatory, known as Bisei Tenmondai, as well as Chuusei Yume-ga-Hara, a sort of themepark devoted to showing what a typical Medieval Japanese mountain village looked like. There you can enjoy making traditional crafts such as indigo dying, Shakuhachi (Japanese flute), and various children's games. Tenmondai and Yume-ga-Hara are conveniently located next to one another. Bisei takes its name from the stars (Bisei means Beautiful Stars).

Ibara prides itself on its art museum, the Denchu Art Museum, located near the city office, honors Hirakushi Denchū (1872–1979), who was born in Nishiebara-mura (What is now Ibara) and became a famous sculptor. Many of his works are on display in the art museum named after him. There is another art museum by the name of Hanatori in Takaya, a suburb of Ibara.

Each year, internationally minded residents and the ALTs host the International Food Festival in front of the Ibara City Station offering visitors a chance sample various ethnic foods. Typically, ALTs will showcase foods from their home countries, but some ALTs elect to provide selections from their ethnic background instead.

Ibara also has three video stores, several large supermarkets, and every August hosts a music festival called Sound Wood (organized by a local entrepreneur).

Transportation
In order to get to Ibara, one can either take the Ibara Tetsudo, a rail line that connects Kannabe (in Hiroshima Prefecture) to Soja (in Okayama Prefecture) and passes through Ibara; or, one can take a bus from a large number of locations in the Ibara/Kasaoka Region, as well as from Fukuyama in Hiroshima Prefecture.

International relations

Twin towns — Sister cities
Ibara is twinned with:
  Uozu, Toyama, Japan (1982)
  Ōtawara, Tochigi, Japan (1984)

Famous people
 Ikeda Nagaoki
Kanzō Uchiyama

References

External links

 
 Ibara City official website 

Cities in Okayama Prefecture